Henry Washburn may refer to:
Henry Bradford Washburn (1910–2007), American mountaineer
Henry D. Washburn (1832–1871), American politician from Indiana
Henry W. Washburn (1899–1983), American politician from Iowa